Societal innovation refers to a systemic change in the interplay of the state and civil society. It is a relative of social innovation, but differs from it by considering the state to be an important co-creator in achieving sustainable systemic change. In this sense, the term's origins lie beyond the traditional anglosaxon understanding for the concept of social innovation.

The term has been used in research, see e.g.
,
but also in some official reports and documents of the European Union, where societal innovation is considered as an answer to societal challenges. A formal definition exists 

A societal innovation introduces a novel economic and/or social improvement to people’s
everyday life. It brings a (radical or incremental) systemic change to society’s structures or
modes of operation, and it is legitimated by the majority of societal stakeholders.

See also
Aalto Camp for Societal Innovation

Societal Innovation Blog

References

Civil society